Angélique is a series of thirteen historical adventure romance novels written by French author Anne Golon. Originally published from 1957 to 1985, the novels have reportedly sold 150 million copies worldwide and have been adapted into six feature films, several theatre productions, a Japanese manga series, and a French "global manga" comic book series. Only ten of the thirteen novels have been translated into English.

Plot 
The eponymous protagonist, Angélique Sancé de Monteloup, is a 17th-century woman born into the provincial aristocracy in the west of France. In successive books, she marries at a young age the romantic and talented Joffrey de Peyrac, Count of Toulouse; gets her domestic bliss destroyed when King Louis XIV has her husband executed on trumped up charges; descends into the underworld of Paris; emerges and through a turbulent second marriage gets admittance to the court at Versailles; loses her second husband in war, just as she had started to truly love him, and subsequently refuses to become the King's mistress; finds that her first husband is after all alive but is hiding somewhere in the Mediterranean; sets out on a highly risky search, gets captured by pirates, sold into slavery in Crete, taken into the harem of the King of Morocco, stabs the King when he tries to have sex with her, and stages a daring escape along with a French slave who becomes her lover; gets back to France, only to be put under house arrest in her ancestral home and raped by rampaging royal soldiers, which arouses the province to a rebellion which is brutally put down; finds refuge with a Huguenot family and – just as they are threatened by the Revocation of the Edict of Nantes – is saved in the nick of time by her long-lost first husband appearing at La Rochelle and taking them all to America in his ship; and also being reunited with her children, whom she had thought dead but were alive and well in America. Then follow many more adventures in colonial North America – specifically, in French Acadia – involving French and English settlers, tribal natives and pirates.

Novels 
 Angélique: Marquise of the Angels (1957)
 Angélique: The Road to Versailles (1958)
 Angélique and the King (1959)
 Angélique and the Sultan (1960)
 Angélique in Revolt (1961)
 Angélique in Love (1961)
 The Countess Angélique (1964)
 The Temptation of Angélique (1966)
 Angélique and the Demon (1972)
 Angélique and the Ghosts (1976)
  (1980)
  (1984)
  (1985)

Adaptations

Films 
The novels were adapted into a series of five films directed by Bernard Borderie in the 1960s, in a co-production between France, Italy, and Germany. The films starred Michèle Mercier as Angélique and Robert Hossein as Jeoffrey de Peyrac.

  (1964)
  (1965)
  (1966)
  (1967)
  (1968)

A new film adaptation of the first novel was directed by Ariel Zeitoun in 2013. It starred Nora Arnezeder as Angélique and Gérard Lanvin as Joffrey de Peyrac.

 Angélique (2013)

Manga 
A manga series, written and illustrated by Toshie Kihara, was serialized in the Japanese  manga (girls' comics) magazine Princess from 1977 to 1979. It was later collected as five  (book volumes) by the Japanese publisher Akita Shoten.

A "global manga" series, Angélique, written by Oliver Milhaud and illustrated by Dara, was published as three graphic novels by the French publisher Casterman from 2015 to 2016.

Theatre 
The first, was performed by the all-female Takarazuka Revue's Moon Troupe. The second, was performed by the Snow Troupe.

A play, directed by Robert Hossein, was staged at the Palais des Sports in Paris, France, from 1995 to 1996. It starred Cécile Bois as Angélique, with Hossein reprising his 1960s film role as Joffrey de Peyrac.

Another musical, Angelika, was staged at the Broadway Theatre in Prague, Czech Republic, in 2007, 2010, 2016, and 2018.

See also 
 Suzanne du Plessis-Bellière, the alleged inspiration for Angélique's character

Notes

References

External links 
 Official website: archived version, current version
 Book reviews: Kirkus Reviews, The New York Times
 A 2013 press kit featuring an interview with the author about the books and films
 A 2013 article from Le Monde documenting the history of the franchise 

Book franchises
Book series introduced in 1957
French novels adapted into films
French romance novels
Historical novels by series
Novels adapted into comics
Novel series by featured character